HMS E13 was a British E class submarine built by HM Dockyard, Chatham. E13 was laid down on 16 December 1912 and was commissioned on 9 December 1914. The hull cost £101,900 (£ in ).

Design
She was powered by two  Vickers eight-cylinder two-stroke diesel engines and two  electric motors.

As with most of the early E class boats, E13 was not fitted with a deck gun during construction, but one was mounted later. She had five 18 inch (450 mm) torpedo tubes: two in the bow, one either side amidships, and one in the stern; a total of 10 torpedoes were carried.

E-Class submarines had wireless systems with  power ratings; in some submarines, these were later upgraded to  systems by removing a midship torpedo tube. Their maximum design depth was  although in service some reached depths of below . Some submarines contained Fessenden oscillator systems.

Crew
Her complement was three officers and 28 men.

Service history
HMS E13 had a relatively short career during World War I. On 14 August 1915, she was despatched from Harwich, accompanied by her sister vessel HMS E8. The two submarines had orders to sail to the Baltic Sea to interdict German shipping, particularly vessels carrying iron ore shipments from Sweden. At around 01:00 on 18 August 1915, the submarine ran aground in shallow water near Saltholm island in the Øresund between Malmö and Copenhagen, because of a defective gyrocompass. At dawn she became clearly visible. At 05:00 the Royal Danish Navy torpedo boat Narhvalen appeared on the scene and hailed the E13's commander, Lt Cdr Geoffrey Layton, informing him that he had 24 hours to refloat his vessel and leave before he and his crew would be interned for violating Denmark's neutrality.

The E13's crew sought to lighten the submarine by pumping out tanks and discharging fuel, but she had grounded in only  of water and would not move. Layton realised that he would not be able to refloat the E13 before the deadline passed and sent his first lieutenant ashore to arrange a tow or, if this was impracticable, to negotiate terms for internment. He was unable to contact the Admiralty for assistance, as the Germans were jamming radio frequencies.

At 10:28 the German torpedo boat G132 arrived but withdrew when the Danish torpedo boats Støren and Søulven approached. A third Danish torpedo boat, the Tumleren, arrived shortly afterwards.

Meanwhile, the commander of the G132, Oberleutnant zur See Paul Graf von Montgelas, had informed Rear Admiral Robert Mischke by radio about the E13's grounding. German naval operations against the Russian-held city of Riga were at a critical stage and Mischke felt that he could not afford to let the E13 pass into the Baltic, where it could threaten the German offensive in the Gulf of Riga. He ordered G132 and another torpedo boat to destroy the submarine. The two vessels returned to Saltholm and opened fire on the E13 with torpedoes, machine-guns and shell fire from a range of 300 yards. The submarine was hit repeatedly and set on fire. Seeing this, Lt Cdr Layton ordered the submarine to be abandoned, but the firing continued while his men were in the water. The engagement ended when the Danish torpedo boat Søulven placed herself between the submarine and the two German ships, which withdrew. Fourteen of the E13's crew were killed in the attack and one was missing, presumed killed.

The E13's fifteen surviving crew members were interned at the Copenhagen Navy Yard by the Danes for the rest of the war. Layton refused to give his parole and eventually escaped along with his first officer, returning to England to continue the war. He went on to have a distinguished career and commanded the British Eastern Fleet during the Second World War.

The Danish government fitted out the mail steamer Vidar as a temporary chapel to transport the bodies of the casualties back to Hull, accompanied by the Danish torpedo boats Springeren and Støren. Notwithstanding Denmark's neutrality, the dead British sailors were given full honours when their bodies were brought ashore, as a contemporary report described:

The incident caused outrage in Britain and Denmark, since it was clearly a serious breach of international law. The Danish newspaper National Tidende published an indignant leading article protesting at the Germans' violation of Danish neutrality. Politiken reported that the Danish government had protested to Germany, pointing out that the E13 had not been destroyed in any kind of pursuit but while she was lying damaged on neutral territory. The London Times fulminated in a leading article that "the unjustifiable slaughter of the men of the E13 is one more notch in the long score we have to settle with the homicidal brood of Prussia." The German government subsequently apologised to Denmark, stating that "instructions previously given to commanders of German vessels to respect neutrality have once more been impressed upon them."

Although the E13 was refloated by the Danes and towed to Copenhagen, she was so badly damaged by the German attack that her repair was not viable. On 6 February 1919, she was sold by the British government to a Danish company for 150,000 Danish kroner (about £8,330 at 1919 prices). On 14 December 1921, she was resold for scrap.

See also
SMS Dresden

Notes

References
 
 Ship specifications, by Danish Naval History

External links

'Submarine losses 1904 to present day' - Royal Navy Submarine Museum 

 

British E-class submarines of the Royal Navy
Ships built in Chatham
1914 ships
Maritime incidents in 1915
World War I submarines of the United Kingdom
Royal Navy ship names